A number of steamships were named Citta di Napoli, including:

, in service 1888–91
, in service 1902–10

Ship names